The 2006 Liga de Fútbol Profesional Boliviano or 2006 Segundo Torneo was a professional football tournament in Bolivia that was played to revert the adjustment to the European calendar caused by the 2005 Torneo Adecuación. This tournament was played at the end of the 2005–06 season.

Teams and venues

Group stage 
Top 3 of each group qualify for final group stage

Group 1

Group 2

Final group

Topscorers

Promotion/relegation play-off

First leg

Second leg 

Club Destroyers win 3–2 on aggregate. Club Destroyers remain at the top level.

See also 
 Bolivia national football team 2006

References 
 Soccerway Page
 RSSSF Page

2006
Bolivia
1